Aardvark is a 2017 American drama film directed and written by Brian Shoaf. The film stars Zachary Quinto, Jenny Slate, Sheila Vand, and Jon Hamm. Principal photography began on November 30, 2015 in New York City. It premiered at the 2017 Tribeca Film Festival. It was released on April 13, 2018. Emily Milburton is a therapist who is struggling with personal problems. Things change when she meets her new patient, Josh Norman, who is mentally ill. Josh starts to develop feelings for Emily but things get interesting when Emily falls for Josh's brother, Craig.

Cast 
 Zachary Quinto as Josh Norman, Craig’s brother
 Jenny Slate as Emily Milburton
 Jon Hamm as Craig Norman, Josh's brother
 Sheila Vand as Hannah
 Tonya Pinkins as Abigail
 Marin Ireland as Jenny
 Peter Grosz as Anthony
 Dale Soules as Lucille

Production 
On October 23, 2015, it was announced that Brian Shoaf would direct a drama film Aardvark based on his own script, while Zachary Quinto would produce the film along with Susan Leber and Neal Dodson. Great Point Media would be financing the film.

Principal photography on the film began on November 30, 2015 in New York City.

Reception
On review aggregator website Rotten Tomatoes, the film holds an approval rating of 12% based on 25 reviews, and an average rating of 3.8/10. On Metacritic, the film has a weighted average score of 39 out of 100, based on 12 critics, indicating "generally unfavorable reviews".

References

External links 
 

2017 films
American drama films
2017 drama films
Films shot in New York City
Films about mental health
2017 directorial debut films
2010s English-language films
2010s American films